Nationality words link to articles with information on the nation's poetry or literature (for instance, Irish or France).

Events

 William Wordsworth granted an honorary Doctor of Civil Law degree by Oxford University.

Works published

United Kingdom
 Philip James Bailey, Festus, reprinted in numerous editions up to 1889, when the 50th anniversary edition was published
 Thomas De Quincey, biographical essays on the Lake Poets in the series Recollections of the Lake Poets, in Tait's Edinburgh Magazine (see also Recollections 1834, 1835, 1840):
 "William Wordsworth," January, February, and April
 "William Wordsworth and Robert Southey," July
 "Southey, Wordsworth, and Coleridge," August
 "Recollections of Grasmere," September
 "The Saracen's Head," December
 William Gaskell, Temperance Rhymes
 Henry Hart Milman, Poetical Works
 Percy Bysshe Shelley, posthumous works (died 1822):
 The Poetical Works of Percy Bysshe Shelley in four volumes is published from January to May, edited by Mary Shelley, with her preface and notes, and dedicated to the Shelleys' son, Percy Florence Shelley; London: Edward Moxon (reprinted in 1847)
 England in 1819, a political sonnet composed in 1819, first published
 The 'Pearl Poet', Sir Gawain and the Green Knight, a late 14th-century Middle English alliterative romance first published complete, in Syr Gawayne: a collection of ancient romance-poems by Scottish and English authors relating to that celebrated knight of the Round Table edited by Frederic Madden for the Bannatyne Club

United States
 Ralph Waldo Emerson:
 "Each and All", a poem calling Nature "the perfect whole"
 "The Humble-Bee", praising the "yellow breeched philosopher"
 "The Rhodora"
 Henry Wadsworth Longfellow, Voices of the Night, the author's first volume of original poetry; includes "A Psalm of Life" and "Light of the Stars"
 Edgar Allan Poe, The Haunted Palace, an allegory of mental states; considered one of the author's best poems, written at a time when his finances forced him to concentrate on stories rather than poetry; originally published in the Baltimore Museum and later included in "The Fall of the House of Usher"
 William Gilmore Simms, Southern Passages and Pictures, lyrical, sentimental and descriptive poems; New York
 Jones Very, Essays and Poems, prose and poetry

Other
 Bjarni Thorarensen, Íslands minni, Iceland
 Cláudio Manuel da Costa, Vila Rica, posthumous, Brazil
 Girolamo de Rada, Serafina Topia, Arbëresh
 Marceline Desbordes-Valmore, Pauvres Fleurs, France
 Gooru Churun Dutt, School Hours or Poems Composed at School, Calcutta: T. B. Scott and Co.; India, Indian poetry in English

Births
Death years link to the corresponding "[year] in poetry" article:
 January 1 - James Ryder Randall (died 1908), American
 February 2 - Helen Marr Hurd (died 1909), American
 February 7 - William Little (died 1916), English-born Australian
 February 9 - Laura Redden Searing (died 1923), deaf American poet and journalist
 March 16 - John Butler Yeats (died 1922), Irish artist and poet, father of W. B. Yeats
 April 18 - Henry Kendall (died 1882), Australian
 June 21 - Joaquim Maria Machado de Assis (died 1909), Brazilian
 August 3 - Helen Adelia Manville (died 1912), American poet and litterateur
 August 4 - Walter Pater (died 1894), English writer on aesthetics
 August 25 - Bret Harte (died 1902), American writer of fiction and poetry
 December 30 - John Todhunter (died 1916), Irish poet and playwright
 Date not known - Velutheri Kesavan Vaidyar (died 1897), Indian, Malayalam-language poet

Deaths
Birth years link to the corresponding "[year] in poetry" article:
 April 13 - Robert Millhouse (born 1788), English weaver poet
 April 22 - Thomas Haynes Bayly (born 1797), English
 May 4 - Denis Davydov (born 1784), Russian soldier-poet of the Napoleonic Wars, inventor of a specific genre, hussar poetry, noted for its hedonism and bravado
 May 21 - José María Heredia y Heredia (born 1803), Cuban poet in Mexico
 July 15 - Winthrop Mackworth Praed (born 1802), English poet
 October 11 - Leonor de Almeida Portugal (born 1750), Portuguese poet

See also

 19th century in poetry
 19th century in literature
 List of years in poetry
 List of years in literature
 Victorian literature
 French literature of the 19th century
 Biedermeier era of German literature
 Golden Age of Russian Poetry (1800–1850)
 Young Germany (Junges Deutschland) a loose group of German writers from about 1830 to 1850
 List of poets
 Poetry
 List of poetry awards

Notes

19th-century poetry
Poetry